Audioconfusion is a recording studio in Mesa, Arizona. It was established 1996. The newest incarnation of the studio was built in 2006. It is owned and operated by Jalipaz Nelson. Audioconfusion is notable for its production and recording of various independent Phoenix bands, especially the first four studio albums by AJJ (and the majority of all of their recorded output with the exception of their two most recent studio records). The studio's sound emphasizes natural reverb and live recording methods.

History
Originally from Pennsylvania, Jalipaz Nelson settled in Arizona at the premature culmination of a road trip when he was hindered from crossing the California border due to ferret regulations. In 1995, Nelson attended an introductory recording program in Ohio prior to starting Audioconfusion in 1996. In 2004, he began The Audioconfusion Manifesto. In 2006, he constructed a new studio which measures 1000 ft2. He later partnered with Dan Somers, an early department head of Radio Phoenix.

The Audioconfusion Manifesto was an independent record label and musical collective (the titular manifesto was non-existent). Bands in the Phoenix scene organized around recording at the newly constructed Audioconfusion studio. Participating bands included AJJ, Peachcake, and Asleep in the Sea. The first studio album by AJJ, Candy Cigarettes & Cap Guns, was originally released by The Audioconfusion Manifesto and recorded at Audioconfusion, prior to being re-released on Asian Man Records. In 2010, a similar collective and label outfit called Black Cactus Records was founded. Both Nelson and Somers were founding members.

Artists
Artists produced by Jalipaz Nelson and Audioconfusion include:
 AJJ
 The Necronauts
 Red Tank!
 Jeremiah Craig
 Okilly Dokilly
 The Edisons
 Beach Bummer
 Blu Joy
 Citrus Clouds
 Funerary
 Lisa Savidge
 JJCNV
 Diners
 Dogbreth
 Playboy Manbaby
 The Haymarket Squares
 The Oxford Coma
 The Old Storm
 Snail Quail
 Sundressed
 Twingiant
 Gloomsday
 Asleep in the Sea
 Peachcake
 The Echo Bombs
 Paronym
 Some Dark Hollow
 Scott Gesser
 Shawn Skinner and the Men of Reason
 Huckleberry
 Tony Martinez
 Gale
 FGGTFAILUR
 Hug of War
 Eric Schlappi
 Tierra Firme
 Space Alien Donald
Sad Dance Party

Selected Discography

Notes

External links
 Audioconfusion — official site

Recording studios in the United States
Companies based in Mesa, Arizona
1996 establishments in Arizona